The National Rally for Reform and Development, often known by its shortened Arabic name Tewassoul or by the abbreviation of its French name (RNRD), is an Islamist political party in Mauritania. The party is associated with the Mauritanian branch of the Muslim Brotherhood.

As a result of the 2013 and 2018 parliamentary election, Tewassoul has become the second largest political party in Mauritania.

History
The roots of Tewassoul go back to the Islamic Movement that began to be organized in Mauritania in 1975, being based on the ideas of the Muslim Brotherhood, but it remained an unauthorized secret political movement due to the different authoritarian regimes in Mauritania's history.

The Islamists were prevented from licensing any political party even after the introduction of multi-party politics in the 1990s. Nevertheless, the Islamic Movement remained present as a significant force in the local political arena, especially with its rejection of the diplomatic ties established between Mauritania and Israel between 1999 and 2009.

After the 2005 coup, and the overthrow of the regime of President Maaouya Ould Sid'Ahmed Taya, the Islamists tried to register a political party, but the military council leading the transitional phase rejected their request, which prompted them to launch the “Initiative of Moderate Reformists” on November 23, 2005, which enabled them to enter parliament and win some municipalities as independents in the 2006 elections.

The "Centrist Reformists" (successors of the Initiative of Moderate Reformists) endorsed Saleh Ould Hanenna in the first round of the 2007 presidential election, with them backing Ahmed Ould Daddah in the second round. The winner of the 2007 election, Sidi Ould Cheikh Abdallahi, finally granted the Mauritanian Islamists a legal political party in 2007.

Leadership

President
 Mohamed Jemil Ould Mansour (2007–25 December 2017)
 Mohamed Mahmoud Ould Seyidi (25 December 2017–25 December 2022)
 Hamadi Ould Sidi Mokhtar (25 December 2022–)

Election results

Presidential

References

External links
 Tewassoul Facebook Account
 Tewassoul Youtube Channel
 Tewassoul Twitter Account

Political parties in Mauritania
Conservative parties in Africa
Muslim Brotherhood
Islamic political parties